English Padam is a 2017 Indian Tamil-language horror comedy film directed by Kumaresh kumar, starring Sanjeev, Meenakshi and Ramki.

Synopsis

Sanjeev is a villager who comes to Chennai to earn money for his sister's marriage. He stays with his uncle Singamuthu. He comes across Meenakshi, a thief and gradually falls for her. After seeing an advertisement for making easy money by staying in a house for one night, Sanjeev and Singamuthu go to Mosquito Kumar. Kumar takes them to P. Pandu and tells them that they need to stay in the house for one night so that Pandu can sell it, since potential buyers fear the presence of ghost rumours planted by Pandu's rivals.

They stay in the house and encounter strange things. They then discover it is the handiwork of Meenakshi who is paid by Pandu's rivals. Then Ramki appears, who is actually planning to rent the house to a Marwadi family. Sanjeev, Meenakshi, Singamuthu and Mosquito Kumar are cheated by Ramki. They then decide to kill him, without success. Finally they plan to scare out the Marwadi family. They approach Singamuthu who is a fake shaman. Singamuthu promises to send ghosts to Seth house.

Cast

Ramki as Rail Murugan
Sanjeev as Chella
Meenakshi as Meenakshi (blind parents daughter and an IAS-passed candidate)
Sreeja Das as Mohana Sundari (Mona)
Kumaresh Kumar as Kosu Kumar
Singamuthu as Chella's uncle
Singampuli as Iruttu Pusari
Jangiri Madhumitha as Bobby
Crane Manohar as Iruttu Pusari's assistant
Pandu as House owner
Scissor Manohar as Rail Murugan's henchman
Lollu Sabha Manohar as Rail Murugan's henchman
Kadhal Saravanan as Seth

Production
Ramki escaped unhurt while shooting a car chase sequence when a car lost control and almost hit him. The film is titled as English Padam; however, the CBFC certificate says Aangila Padam.

Reception
M. Suganth of The Times of India rated the film 1.5 out of 5 and opined that "The film is structured as a horror comedy, but be in the writing or in the making, it lacks even the basic level of competence". A critic from Maalaimalar called the film average.

References

External links
 

2017 films
Indian comedy horror films
2017 comedy horror films